Me and the Boys may refer to:

 Me and the Boys (TV series), an American sitcom that aired on the ABC network
 Me and the Boys (album), a 1985 album by The Charlie Daniels Band
 Me and the Boys (meme), an internet meme

See also
 "The Boys and Me", a song recorded by Sawyer Brown